Podgórki may refer to the following places in Poland:
Podgórki, Lower Silesian Voivodeship (south-west Poland)
Podgórki, Masovian Voivodeship (east-central Poland)
Podgórki, West Pomeranian Voivodeship (north-west Poland)